XHPNK-FM is a radio station on 103.5 FM in Los Mochis, Sinaloa. It is owned by Grupo Radio Centro and is known as Radio Variedades with a romantic format.

History
XEPNK-AM 880 received its concession on November 19, 1980. The 5,000-watt daytimer was owned by Felipe García de León. In the mid-1980s, García de León traded XEPNK to Grupo OIR in exchange for XEOS and XEHX radio in Ciudad Obregón, Sonora. The concession transferred to Radio y Televisión de Sinaloa in 1993, around which time XEPNK boosted its power to 10,000 watts day and 2,000 night.

In 2011, XEPNK moved to FM as XHPNK-FM 103.5.

In 2016, after Grupo Radio México transferred operational control of the station to Radiorama, XHPNK changed names from La Rancherita to Romántica as part of a frequency shuffle of formats at the cluster. GRC, GRM's successor, resumed operating the stations in February 2019, with XHPNK becoming Radio Variedades, the former name of XHCW-FM 96.5.

On March 10, 2021, the Federal Telecommunications Institute denied an application for the renewal of XHPNK-FM's concession for failure to pay the final installment of its fee to move to FM.

References

Radio stations in Sinaloa